For Big Stakes is a 1922 American silent Western film directed by Lynn Reynolds and starring Tom Mix. It was produced by and distributed by Fox Film Corporation.

Cast
 Tom Mix as "Clean-up" Sudden
 Patsy Ruth Miller as Dorothy Clark
 Sid Jordan as Scott Mason
 Bert Sprotte as Rowell Clark
 Joe Harris as Ramon Valdez
 Al Fremont as Sheriff Blaisdell
 Earl Simpson as Tin Hon Johnnie
 Tony as himself, a Horse

Preservation status
A copy of For Big Stakes is preserved in a European archive, Narodni Filmovy Archiv, Prague Czech Republic.

References

External links

 
 

1922 films
Films directed by Lynn Reynolds
Fox Film films
1922 Western (genre) films
American black-and-white films
Silent American Western (genre) films
1920s American films
1920s English-language films